"The Fairy Aurora" (in , tr. 'Fairy of Dawn') is a fairy tale written by Ioan Slavici and published in June 1872. Mihai Eminescu urged him to write his first story, which was read at Junimea in two sessions and was published in the magazine Convorbiri Literare.

It appeared in English as "The Fairy Aurora" in the Roumanian Fairy Tales with 18 Romanian stories published in 1885 by Henry Holt and Company in New York City.

Summary
The ruler of a vast empire has one eye that laughs and one eye that cries, and the reason is only known to him. His three sons, Florea, Costan, and Petru each ask him about it on different occasions. Only the youngest, Petru, obtains the answer: the emperor cries because he thinks that after he dies his son will not be able to protect their realm from enemies and that only the water from the fountain of the Fairy of the Dawn will be able to make both his eyes laugh again.

Florea and Costan depart on the quest first, but after escaping a vicious dragon on the bridge, never return home. Petru tries his luck but is less successful than his brothers. His old nurse, back at the palace, advises him to take the emperor's trusty old horse to cross the bridge. The horse is magical and can reach different speeds. With this fabulous steed, Prince Petru kills the dragon, crosses the bridge, and arrives in a desert.

His father's horse asks what speeds they should traverse: like the wind, the drought the desire, or a curse? Petru agrees they should apply different speeds so as to not tire out and to cross the desert as fast as possible. And so they do.

After crossing the desert, Petru and the horse reach a copper forest and traverse it. The flowers cry out to him to pick one of them, but the horse dissuades him because they are cursed and will summon the Welwa, a chimeric monster of the wood. Petru decides to face the Welwa and picks up a flower. The monster appears to face the prince, and they engage in combat for days. Being locked in fierce combat, both pant, and gasp for breath, but Petru's horse encourages him to keep fighting. On the third day of battle, Petru throws the horse's bridle on the Welwa and the creature turns into a horse. The animal thanks Petru for releasing him from a curse, and rubs his nose against Petru's mount (the horse's brother).

Petru and the horses cross through a wood made entirely of silver, the flowers begging to be gathered, but Petru is warned by the first Welwa that gathering the flowers will draw the attention of a second Welwa, even stronger than the first. Despite the danger, Petru plucks the flowers and prepares to face the second Welwa. After three days, and a tiring battle, Petru casts a horse's bridle over the second Welwa, returning to normal.

Lastly, the group passes by a third wood made entirely of gold, and the same warning applies: if any of the flowers are gathered, it will draw yet another Welwa to them.

Translations
Andrew Lang also translated this Romanian tale with the title The Fairy of the Dawn, published in The Violet Fairy Book. The king has one weeping eye and one laughing eye, and asks for the water from the fountain of the Fairy of the Dawn for both eyes to laugh again.

A later translation titled the tale The Dawn Fairy.

Analysis

Tale type
The tale is classified in the international Aarne-Thompson-Uther Index as tale type ATU 551, "The Water of Life" ("Sons on a Quest for a Wonderful Remedy for Their Father").

Despite its origins as a literary tale, author Ioan Slavici claimed that he heard some oral versions across Romania: ; in Zărand, ; in Comloșu (Crișana), ; and in Timișoara, . He stated that, barring a few differences between versions, they all contained the same plot points: the Emperor's eyes, Petru's journey, the help from the holy sisters, the miraculous fountain, and the brothers' deception.

Motifs
According to scholar Adela Ileana Drăucean, the dragons guard the bridge between the kingdom, representing the obstacle the hero, Făt-Frumos, must cross to advance on his quest. The tale also presents, as perilous adversaries to the hero, three , "dark spirit[s] of the forest" with magical powers: "the beldam from the copper forest, the beldam from the silver forest and the beldam from the golden forest."

Scholar Simona Galațchi interprets the "Fairy of Dawn" as a character associated with the dawn, sunlight, youth and rejuvenation, specially due to three magical items she owns: a fountain of life-giving water, a ring of power and "the wine of youth".

See also
 Laughing Eye and Weeping Eye
 The Water of Life (German fairy tale)

Notes

External links
The Fairy of Dawn in The Violet Fairy Book
 Zâna zorilor at Project Gutenberg

Romanian fairy tales
1872 in literature
ATU 500-559